Compilation Appearances Vol. 2 is a compilation album by Lycia, released on July 31, 2001 by Projekt Records.

Track listing

Personnel 
Adapted from the Compilation Appearances Vol. 2 liner notes.
Brian Jensen – mastering
Sam Rosenthal – mastering, design
Mike VanPortfleet – vocals, synthesizer, guitar, drum machine

Release history

References 

2001 compilation albums
Lycia (band) albums
Projekt Records compilation albums